Project Genetrix, also known as WS-119L, was a program (disguised as meteorological research) run by the U.S. Air Force, Navy, and the Central Intelligence Agency during the 1950s. It launched hundreds of surveillance balloons that flew over China, Eastern Europe, and the Soviet Union to take aerial photographs and collect intelligence. The Genetrix balloons were manufactured by the aeronautical division of General Mills. They were about 20 stories tall, carried cameras and other electronic equipment, and reached altitudes ranging from 30,000 to over 60,000 feet, well above the reach of any contemporary fighter plane. The overflights drew protests from target countries, while the United States defended its action.

History

Initiation and testing 
Authorized by President Dwight D. Eisenhower on December 27, 1955, Project 119L was the first espionage use of the balloons that had been tested in previous projects, such as Project Moby Dick. It succeeded Project Mogul, Project Skyhook, and Project Grandson. Eisenhower viewed the reconnaissance efforts as defensive in nature, under the rationale of collecting intelligence on the Sino-Soviet bloc in case of a surprise nuclear attack against NATO. A cover story had been agreed upon to explain the balloons as being used for meteorological research if they were discovered.

In 1955, a number of AN/DMQ-1 gondolas were launched from Lowry Air Force Base in Colorado as a test of the system. One was recovered years later in New Brunswick.

Operation 
Between 10 January and 6 February 1956, a total of 512 high-altitude vehicles were launched from the five different launch sites Gardermoen, Norway; Evanton, Scotland; Oberpfaffenhofen and Giebelstadt, West Germany; and Incirlik, Turkey. 54 were recovered and only 31 provided usable photographs covering over 1.1 million square miles (2.8 million square km) of the Sino-Soviet bloc. Numerous balloons were shot down by the Soviets or blown off course. MiG fighter pilots learned that at sunrise the balloons had dipped into shooting range because the balloons floated to a lower altitude. The lifting gas cooled at night and became denser, reducing lift, so the balloons descended to lower altitudes where the air was denser.

Diplomatic protests and U.S. response 
The balloon flights led to many diplomatic protests from target countries, including Albania, China, and the Soviet Union. The U.S. Secretary of State John F. Dulles claimed that the project was a worldwide meteorological survey. Asked if the United States had the right to send these balloons anywhere around the globe, he answered, "Yes, I think that we feel that way," and questioned legal ownership of the "upper air".

Later development 
The Soviets recovered many of these balloons, and their temperature-resistant and radiation-hardened film would later be used in the Luna 3 probe to capture the first images of the far side of the Moon. Newly developed American spy planes, such as the U-2, would replace the Genetrix balloons in carrying out reconnaissance over denied airspace. Employees from the aeronautical division of General Mills would go on to found Raven Industries.

See also 
 Project HOMERUN
 456th Troop Carrier Wing

References 

 Citations 

 Bibliography 
 Sagan, Carl. The Demon-Haunted World. p. 83 (and others)

Projects of the United States Air Force
Soviet Union–United States relations
Balloons (aeronautics)
Cold War
Violations of Soviet airspace
1956 in military history